The 2013–14 season was Kilmarnock's first season in the newly formed Scottish Premiership. Kilmarnock also competed in the League Cup and the Scottish Cup.

Summary

Season
In their first season under Allan Johnston, Kilmarnock finished ninth in the Scottish Premiership with 39 points. They reached the second round of the League Cup, losing to Hamilton, and the fourth round of the Scottish Cup, losing to Dundee United.

Results & fixtures

Pre season and friendlies

Scottish Premiership

Scottish League Cup

Scottish Cup

Player statistics

Squad
Last updated 10 May 2014

|-
|colspan="8"|Players who left the club during the 2013–14 season
|-

 

|}

Disciplinary record
Includes all competitive matches. 
Last updated 10 May 2014

Team statistics

Final League table

Division summary

Transfers

Players in

Players out

References 

2013andndash;14
Kilmarnock